Geoffrey Donald Page  (born 7 July 1940) is an Australian poet, translator, teacher and jazz enthusiast.

He has published 22 collections of poetry, as well as prose and verse novels. Poetry and jazz are his driving interests, and he has also written a biography of the jazz musician Bernie McGann. He organises poetry readings and jazz events in Canberra.

Life
Geoff Page was born in Grafton, New South Wales, and studied at the University of New England. Sir Earle Page, who was briefly Prime Minister of Australia, was his grandfather.

Career
Page has held residencies at numerous academic, military and political institutions, including Edith Cowan University, Curtin University, the Australian Defence Force Academy, and the University of Wollongong. From 1974 to 2001 Page was head of the English department at Narrabundah College, a secondary college in Canberra. He retired from teaching in 2001.

He has travelled widely, talking on Australian poetry in Switzerland, Britain, Italy, Singapore, China, the United States and New Zealand. His poetic style ranges from lyrical to satirical, from serious to humorous – and often addresses his concerns about contemporary society and politics. Judith Beveridge writes that "Page is a humanely satirical poet. He lets us view our condition with a fusion of the comic and the tragic."

Page is the poetry reviewer for ABC Radio's The Book Show and, for a decade before that, its Books and Writing program.

Page curates the Poetry at the Gods and Jazz at the Gods series at the Gods Cafe in Canberra.

He was awarded the Medal of the Order of Australia in the 2023 Australia Day Honours.

Style

Australian poet John Tranter in his 1983 review of The Younger Australian Poets (edited by Robert Gray and Geoffrey Lehmann)
wrote of Page:
He is not a self-promoter, and his modest output has been inadequately represented in recent anthologies, as the editors of this one quite properly point out. His poetry has been influenced loosely by the American William Carlos Williams. In general, the spare precision of Williams' short lines is a good preventive against galloping garrulity, and in Page's hands it delivers a dry and particularly Australian accent and a thoughtful movement from phrase to phrase. The short line, as a model, can be overdone: 'of 3 a.m.' is an example that does little for me. Page's technique is low-key – his French and American influences are invisible in the texture of his localised speech – yet it enables him to range widely among language and experience.

Awards and nominations
Queensland Premier's Literary Awards for Poetry
2001: Patrick White Award
2001: Grace Leven Prize for Poetry, for Darker and Lighter
2004: ACT Writing and Publishing Awards for poetry for The Indigo Book of Modern Australian Sonnets (editor)
2006: Christopher Brennan Award
2017: ACU Poetry Prize for the poem "Charles S. Ryan to Alice E. Sumner"
2020: ACU Poetry Prize for the poem "Jericho"

Bibliography

Poetry
Collections
 
 
 
 
 
Collected Lives (1986)
Smiling in English, Smoking in French (1987)
Footwork (1988)
Selected Poems (1991)
Gravel Corners (1992)
Human Interest (1994)
Mrs Schnell arrives in heaven, and other light verse (1995)

The Great Forgetting (Geoff Page and Bevan Hayward Pooaraar) (1997)
Bernie McGann: A Life in Jazz (1997)
The Scarring (1999, verse novel)
Collateral Damage (1999)
Darker and Lighter (2001)
My Mother's God (2002)
Drumming on Water (2003, verse novel)
Cartes Postales (2004)
Freehold (2005, verse novel)
Agnostic Skies (2006)
Bahn dance (2007)
Seriatim (2007)
Coda for Shirley (2011)
A Sudden Sentence in the Air: Jazz Poems (2011)
Cloudy Nouns (2012)
Shifting Windows (2012)
1953 (2013)
New and Selected Poems (2013)
Improving the News (2013)
Gods and Uncles (2015)
Cara Carissima, a verse drama (2015)
Elegy for Emily: A verse biography of Emily Remler (1957–1990) (2018
Plevna: A Biography in Verse: Sir Charles 'Plevna' Ryan (1853–1926) UWA Publishing (2016)

List of poems

Criticism and anthologies
A Reader's Guide to Contemporary Australian Poetry (1995)
The Indigo Book of Modern Australian Sonnets (as editor) (2003), winner of the 2004 ACT Writing and Publishing Awards for poetry
60 Classic Australian Poems (2009, and a companion to his 80 Great Poems from Chaucer to Now)

Book reviews

Memoirs and nonfiction
Invisible Histories (1989)
Bernie McGann: A life in jazz (1997)
Canberra Then and Now (2013)
Aficionado: A Jazz Memoir (2014)

Works in progress
Shadows from Wire (Poems and photographs in the Great War, as editor)
Benton's Conviction (A Novel)
Century of Clouds (Selected Poems of Guillaume Apollinaire, translations with Wendy Coutts)

References 

1940 births
Australian biographers
Male biographers
Australian poets
Recipients of the Medal of the Order of Australia
Writers from the Australian Capital Territory
Living people
People from Grafton, New South Wales
Patrick White Award winners
Australian male poets
Australian Book Review people
Quadrant (magazine) people